Glucagon-like peptide-2 (GLP-2) is a 33 amino acid peptide with the sequence HADGSFSDEMNTILDNLAARDFINWLIQTKITD (see Proteinogenic amino acid) in humans. GLP-2 is created by specific post-translational proteolytic cleavage of proglucagon in a process that also liberates the related glucagon-like peptide-1 (GLP-1). GLP-2 is produced by the intestinal endocrine L cell and by various neurons in the central nervous system. Intestinal GLP-2 is co-secreted along with GLP-1 upon nutrient ingestion.

When externally administered, GLP-2 produces a number of effects in humans and rodents, including intestinal growth, enhancement of intestinal function, reduction in bone breakdown and neuroprotection. GLP-2 may act in an endocrine fashion to link intestinal growth and metabolism with nutrient intake. GLP-2 and related analogs may be treatments for short bowel syndrome, Crohn's disease, osteoporosis and as adjuvant therapy during cancer chemotherapy.

GLP-2 has an antidepressant effect in a mouse model of depression when delivered via intracerebroventricular injection. However, a GLP-2 derivative (PAS-CPP-GLP-2) was shown to be efficiently delivered to the brain intranasally, with similar efficacy.

See also
 Glucagon-like peptide 2 receptor

References

External links
 

Biomolecules